Red Charleston was an American baseball catcher in the Negro leagues. He played professionally from 1920 to 1932 with several teams.

References

External links
 and Baseball-Reference Black Baseball stats and Seamheads

Birmingham Black Barons players
Baseball catchers